Northwestern Medical Center is a hospital in St. Albans, Vermont.

History
The St. Albans Hospital, in St. Albans, Vermont, was established in 1883.  The Kerbs Memorial Hospital, also in St. Albans, was established in 1950. In 1978, these two hospitals merged into Northwestern Medical Center.

References

Hospitals in Vermont
Buildings and structures in St. Albans (town), Vermont
Hospitals established in 1883
1883 establishments in Vermont
1978 establishments in Vermont